Aliyan Rural District is a rural district (dehestan) in Sardar-e Jangal District, Fuman County, Gilan Province, Iran. At the 2006 census, its population was 4,474, in 1,146 families. The rural district has 19 villages.

References 

Rural Districts of Gilan Province
Fuman County